The voiced alveolar implosive is a type of consonantal sound, used in some spoken languages. The IPA symbol is lowercase letter d with a rightward hook protruding from the upper right of the letter.

Features
Features of the voiced alveolar implosive:

Occurrence

See also
 Index of phonetics articles
 Voiceless alveolar implosive

Notes

References

External links
 

Alveolar consonants
Implosives
Central consonants
Voiced oral consonants